Frank Hartmann may refer to:
 Frank Hartmann (footballer, born August 1960), German footballer who played for Hannover 96 and FC Bayern Munich
 Frank Hartmann (footballer, born September 1960), German footballer who played for 1. FC Köln, FC Schalke 04, 1. FC Kaiserslautern and SG Wattenscheid 09
 Frank Hartmann (wrestler) (born 1949), East German wrestler who participated in the 1972 Olympics